A by-election was held for the South Australian House of Assembly seat of Alexandra on 9 May 1992. This was triggered by the resignation of former state Liberal MHA Ted Chapman. The seat had been retained by the Liberals since it was created and first contested at the 1973 state election. The by-election was held on the same day as the Kavel state by-election.

Results
The Liberals retained the seat after preferences.

See also
List of South Australian House of Assembly by-elections

References

South Australian state by-elections
1992 elections in Australia
1990s in South Australia